Vysekal is a surname. Notable people with the surname include:

Edouard Vysekal (1890–1939), American painter and art educator
Luvena Vysekal (1873–1954), American painter